Elvira Presents Monster Hits is the second of three Halloween compilation albums presented by Elvira, Mistress of the Dark.  It was released in September 1994, following Elvira Presents Haunted Hits, and followed by Elvira Presents Revenge Of the Monster Hits.

Tracklisting
 Introduction - Elvira
 "Monsta' Rap" - Elvira
 "Little Demon" - Screamin' Jay Hawkins
 "Feed My Frankenstein" - Alice Cooper
 "Monster Mash" - Bobby 'Boris' Pickett (re-recording)
 "Nightmare On My Street" - D.J. Jazzy Jeff & The Fresh Prince
 "The Addams Family Theme" - Joey Gaynor
 "Here Comes the Bride (the Bride of Frankenstein)" - Elvira
 Outro - Elvira

External links
Artist Direct

Halloween albums
1994 compilation albums
Elvira, Mistress of the Dark